Joanne McKinley (born 1 August 1988) is a Northern Irish former cricketer who played primarily as a right-arm medium bowler. She appeared in one One Day International for Ireland in 2008, against the West Indies.

References

External links 
 
 

1988 births
Living people
People from Larne
Irish women cricketers
Ireland women One Day International cricketers